David S. Painter (born 1948) is an associate professor of international history at Georgetown University. He is a leading scholar of the Cold War and United States foreign policy during the 20th century, with particular emphasis on their relation to oil.

Education and career 
Painter studied history at King College (BA 1970), Oxford as a Rhodes Scholar (BA 1973), and the University of North Carolina at Chapel Hill (PhD 1982). In addition to his career in academia, Painter has worked for the Congressional Research Service, the Department of Energy, and the State Department. In 2008, he was a visiting fellow at the Norwegian Nobel Institute. He also serves on the advisory board for H-Energy.

Work 
Painter's classic work has turned out to be his very first book: Oil and the American Century, published in 1986. Influenced by the work of Ellis Hawley and others, and operating within a corporatist framework, the study is an "impressively researched monograph that devotes particular attention to the close collaboration between public policy makers and oil company official," a partnership that led to "the evolution of an American foreign oil policy that protected dwindling American domestic reserves, met American security needs, and guaranteed American access to foreign oil." Painter emphasizes on the importance of understanding the extent to which the American economy is fueled by Oil and how United States has used oil to pursue their foreign policy and domestic strategic objectives. In his paper Painter argues, “Maintaining access to oil became a key priority of U.S foreign policy and involved the United States in regional and conflicts in Latin America, the Middle East and other oil-producing areas in ways that distorted development in many countries” and “The importance of oil to U.S goals led the nation to take an active interest in the security and stability of the Middle East. U.S leaders viewed Iran as a strategic buffer between the Soviet Union and U.S oil interests in the Persian Gulf” 
Providing more details, he examines the source of major doctrines and writes “Most of the major doctrines of postwar U.S foreign policy – the Truman, Eisenhower, Nixon and Carter Doctrines-related, either directly or indirectly, to the Middle East and its oil”. He also adds on how control over Persian oil remains a top U.S priority, “Even though the United States obtained only a relatively small portions of its oil needs from the Persian Gulf, Oil from this region played a crucial role in the world oil economy, and the global nature of world oil markets meant that shortfall anywhere would reflected in higher prices, if not shortages, in other parts of the worlds”

One historian opined that, "if anything proves more remarkable than the ambitious scope of this study, it is the extent to which Painter accomplishes his objectives. [… It] may also be the most important book yet written on America's foreign oil policy." Others described it variously as "exemplary" and "superb". The 1987 UK edition has not been out of print since its original publication.

Painter's 1999 history of the Cold War was described as an "excellent", a book that "presents a very good analysis of the end of the Cold War, emphasizing the economic weakness of the Soviet Union and the strains of the arms race upon the Soviet economy."

Selected publications

Books and case studies 

 (Co-editor with Melvyn P. Leffler).

Published in the UK as

Articles and book chapters 

 (Co-author with J. R. McNeill).

 (Co-author with Thomas Blanton).

Notes

References

External links 

Painter's staff page on Georgetown's website
Painter's H-Net profile

Living people
Alumni of Lincoln College, Oxford
21st-century American historians
21st-century American male writers
American Rhodes Scholars
Cold War historians
Historians of American foreign relations
University of North Carolina at Chapel Hill alumni
1948 births
American male non-fiction writers